Kalateh Shirin (also Romanized as Kalāteh Shīrīn) is a village in Bizaki Rural District, Golbajar District, Chenaran County, Razavi Khorasan Province, Iran. At the 2006 census, its population was 116, in 32 families.

References 

Populated places in Chenaran County